Nandita Saha is an Indian  table-tennis player. She was a part of Indian trio who defeated Canada in Common wealth 2006 at Melbourne and won Bronze medal for India. She won Bronze Medal in Women's singles in Senior National TT Championship in 2010. Twice Gold medal winner in Mixed Doubles in National Championship. Represented India in various World Championship, Asian Championship, Commonwealth Championship and SAF Games. She also represented India in Manchester Commonwealth Games in 2002. Currently working at Oil India Limited.

References 

1984 births
Living people
Indian female table tennis players
Table tennis players at the 2006 Commonwealth Games
Commonwealth Games medallists in table tennis
Commonwealth Games bronze medallists for India
Medallists at the 2006 Commonwealth Games